In mathematics, a toral subalgebra is a Lie subalgebra of a general linear Lie algebra all of whose elements are semisimple (or diagonalizable over an algebraically closed field). Equivalently, a Lie algebra is toral if it contains no nonzero nilpotent elements.  Over an algebraically closed field, every toral Lie algebra is abelian; thus, its elements are simultaneously diagonalizable.

In semisimple and reductive Lie algebras 
A maximal toral Lie subalgebra of a finite-dimensional semisimple Lie algebra, or more generally of a finite-dimensional reductive Lie algebra, over an algebraically closed field of characteristic 0 is a Cartan subalgebra and vice versa.

For more general Lie algebras, a Cartan subalgebra may differ from a maximal toral subalgebra.

In a finite-dimensional semisimple Lie algebra  over an algebraically closed field of a characteristic zero, a toral subalgebra exists. In fact, if  has only nilpotent elements, then it is nilpotent (Engel's theorem), but then its Killing form is identically zero, contradicting semisimplicity. Hence,  must have a nonzero semisimple element, say x; the linear span of x is then a toral subalgebra.

See also 
 Maximal torus, in the theory of Lie groups

References

Properties of Lie algebras